Battlestar Galactica is an American science fiction television series created by Glen A. Larson and starring Lorne Greene, Richard Hatch, and Dirk Benedict. The series follows the surviving humans as they flee in the fictional spacecraft of the same name in search for a new home while they are being pursued by the Cylons. 

The series ran for the 1978–1979 season before being canceled after 24 episodes. It also spawned into a media franchise, which includes a spin-off show, comics, a reimagined miniseries and weekly series, theme park attractions, and games.

Show summary
In a distant star system, the Twelve Colonies of Mankind were reaching the end of a thousand-year war with the Cylons, warrior robots created by a reptilian race which expired long ago, presumably destroyed by their own creations. Humanity was ultimately defeated in a sneak attack on their homeworlds by the Cylons, carried out with the help of a human traitor, Baltar. Protected by the last surviving capital warship, a "battlestar", named Galactica, the survivors fled in available ships. The Commander of the Galactica, Adama, led this "rag-tag fugitive fleet" of 220 ships in search of a new home. They begin a quest to find the long lost thirteenth tribe of humanity that had settled on a legendary planet called Earth. However, the Cylons continued to pursue them relentlessly across the galaxy. The main characters include Captain Apollo, a Colonial warrior, fighter pilot and the son of Adama. His best friend is Lieutenant Starbuck, a gambler and womanizer.

The era in which this exodus took place is never clearly stated in the series itself. At the start of the series, it is mentioned as being "the seventh millennium of time", although it is unknown when this is in relation to Earth's history. The final aired episode, "The Hand of God", indicates that the original series took place after the Apollo 11 moon landing in 1969 as the Galactica receives a television transmission from Earth showing the landing. The later Galactica 1980 series is expressly set in the year 1980 after a 30-year voyage to Earth.

A member of the Church of Jesus Christ of Latter-day Saints, Larson incorporated many themes from Mormon theology into the shows.

Pilot and subsequent changes

The pilot to this series, budgeted at $8 million (one of the most expensive at that time), was released theatrically in Sensurround.  A shortened (125-minute), edited version was released on July 8, 1978, in several regions including Canada, Japan, and select Western European countries.

On September 17, 1978, the full 148-minute pilot premiered on ABC to high Nielsen ratings.  Two thirds of the way through the broadcast, ABC interrupted with a special report of the signing of the Camp David Accords at the White House by Israeli Prime Minister Menachem Begin and Egyptian President Anwar Sadat, witnessed by U.S. President Jimmy Carter.  After the ceremony, ABC resumed the broadcast at the point where it was interrupted.  This interruption did not occur on the West Coast.  After the pilot aired, the 125-minute theatrical version was given a nationwide U.S. cinema release in May 1979.

The pilot had originally been announced as the first of three made for TV movies.  After broadcast of the second episode, "Lost Planet of the Gods", however, Glen Larson announced the format change to a weekly series, catching his writing and production staff off guard.  This resulted in several 'crash of the week' episodes until other scripts could resume. "Lost Planet of the Gods" also introduced a costume change from the original, in that the warriors' dress uniform featured a gold-trimmed cape falling to upper thigh.  Because of the costume change, a portion of the pilot was reshot; this refilmed version was released in cinemas in 1979.  The original version of the warriors' dress uniform, a plain, mid-thigh-length cape, is documented in The Official Battlestar Galactica Scrapbook by James Neyland, 1978.

Criticism
Battlestar Galactica was criticized by Melor Sturua in the Soviet newspaper Izvestia. He saw an analogy between the fictional Colonial/Cylon negotiations and the US/Soviet SALT talks and accused the series of being inspired by anti-Soviet hysteria:

Legal actions
In 1978, 20th Century Fox sued Universal Studios (producers of Battlestar Galactica) for plagiarism, copyright infringement, unfair competition, and Lanham Act claims, claiming it had stolen 34 distinct ideas from Star Wars. Universal promptly countersued, claiming Star Wars had stolen ideas from their 1972 film Silent Running, notably the robot "drones", and the Buck Rogers serials of the 1930s. 20th Century Fox's copyright claims were initially dismissed by the trial court in 1980, then the United States Court of Appeals for the Ninth Circuit remanded the case for trial in 1983. It was later "resolved without trial".

Star Wars director George Lucas also threatened legal action against Apogee, Inc., the visual effects studio formed by John Dykstra and several other former artists from Lucas' Industrial Light and Magic who decided to remain in Van Nuys rather than relocate to San Rafael, California with the rest of the company. Lucas claimed that Apogee's work on Galactica was being done with equipment that he had left behind, for a project that would be in direct competition against Star Wars. Eventually, Apogee agreed to surrender the equipment to ILM, and several members of Dykstra's team returned to ILM. Afterwards, Universal's newly formed visual effects division, Universal Hartland Visual Effects, took over the show's visual effects for the remainder of its run. Lucas also went after Galactica merchandise, claiming that the Cylon Raider and Colonial Viper toys could be confused with his own Star Wars toys. His major contention was that the Galactica toys featured plastic pellets that could be fired to simulate lasers, and these constituted a choking hazard for children, and he did not want to be blamed for any such accidents, despite none of the Star Wars toys offered by Kenner having anything similar.

Such an accident came to pass on Christmas Day 1978, when a four–year old child accidentally shot one of the pellets from a Cylon Raider toy into his mouth, where it lodged in his larynx and caused his brain to be deprived of oxygen: he was declared dead on New Year's Eve 1978. The following year, Mattel issued an immediate recall of all Galactica toys, and the boy's parents sued Mattel. A second incident involved the Colonial Viper toy which ended in emergency surgery to remove an inhaled pellet from a young boy's lungs. The second incident was not fatal, but Mattel subsequently redesigned all of its Galactica toys so that the pellets no longer left the toy when fired.

Ratings
Battlestar Galactica initially was a ratings success. CBS counter programmed by moving its Sunday block of All in the Family and Alice an hour earlier, to compete with Galactica in the 8:00 timeslot. From October 1978 to March 1979, All in the Family averaged more than 40 percent of the 8:00 audience, against Galactica's 28 percent.

In mid-April 1979, ABC executives canceled the show. An AP article reported "The decision to bump the expensive Battlestar Galactica was not surprising. The series ... had been broadcast irregularly in recent weeks, attracting slightly over a quarter of the audience in its Sunday night time slot." Larson claimed that it was a failed attempt by ABC to reposition its number one program Mork & Mindy into a more lucrative timeslot. The cancellation led to viewer outrage and protests outside ABC studios, and it even contributed to the suicide of Edward Seidel, a 15-year-old boy in Saint Paul, Minnesota who was obsessed with the program.

For the 1978–79 season as a whole, Battlestar Galactica ranked 34th out of 114 shows airing that season, averaging a 19.6 rating and a 30 share.

Language

While primarily English, the Colonial language was written to include several fictional words that differentiated its culture from those of Earth, most notably time units and expletives. The words were roughly equivalent to their English counterparts, and the minor technical differences in meaning were suggestive to the viewer. Colonial distance and time units were incompletely explained and inconsistent in their usage, but appear to have been primarily in a decimal format.

Time units included micron (less than one second), centon (minute), centar (hour), cycle (day), secton (week), sectar (month), quatron (unknown, perhaps a 25 centar day or maybe 1/4 yahren), yahren (Colonial year), and centuron (Colonial century). 

Deprecated time units A millicenton was about 10 minutes long and only used in the first few episodes.  The microcenton was replaced with the micron after the 2nd episode "Lost Planet of the Gods".

Distance units were metron (meter), maxim, hectar, and a few other rarely used words.

Expletives included "frack", also spelled "frak" (interjection), "felgercarb" (noun), and "golmogging", also spelled "gall-mogging" and "galmonging" (adjective). These words avoided US FCC guidelines on the use of profanities and the associated fines.

Other terms included daggit (a canine–like animal indigenous to one of the colonies), ducat (ticket), pyramid (card game), cubit (unit of currency represented by rectangular coins), triad (a full contact ball and goal game similar to basketball), lupus (a wolf-like animal indigenous to another of the colonies), travelator (travel agent), and sociolator (prostitute).

Figures of speech There were a number of these used in the series, such as "daggit dribble", a term used to condemn falsehood, and "daggit-meat", used as an expression of contempt.

Music

The show's original music was composed and conducted by Stu Phillips, with the pilot score performed by the Los Angeles Philharmonic Orchestra. It was recorded at 20th Century Fox, which later sued Universal over the series. MCA Records released a soundtrack album on LP and cassette with Phillips as the music producer; the album was later reissued on compact disc by Edel in 1993, and Geffen Records in 2003. For the series, Phillips used a studio orchestra at Universal, although the theme and end credits music as recorded by the LAPO were retained.

In 2011–2012 Intrada Records released four albums featuring Phillips's music for the series, representing the first commercial release of music other than that of the pilot. (Phillips previously produced a four-CD promotional set.) Except the first, all are two-disc sets.
 2011: Battlestar Galactica Volume 1: "Saga of a Star World".
 2011: Battlestar Galactica Volume 2: "Lost Planet of the Gods" parts 1 and 2, and "Gun on Ice Planet Zero" parts 1 and 2.
 2012: Battlestar Galactica Volume 3: "The Long Patrol", "The Lost Warrior", "The Magnificent Warriors", "The Young Lords", "Murder on the Rising Star", "Take the Celestra", "The Hand of God", and Galactica 1980's "The Return of Starbuck".
 2012: Battlestar Galactica Volume 4: "The Living Legend" parts 1 and 2, and "War of the Gods" parts 1 and 2, plus music recorded for Mission Galactica: The Cylon Attack and Galactica 1980.

"Fire in Space", "The Man with Nine Lives", "Greetings from Earth", "Baltar's Escape", and "Experiment in Terra" were entirely tracked with preexisting material.

Follow-on projects
In 1999, Richard Hatch (who had played Apollo) released a trailer for a proposed sequel, Battlestar Galactica: The Second Coming.

The series was remade with a reimagined three-hour miniseries in 2003 and followed by a weekly series that ran from 2004 to 2009. 

In 2009, Bryan Singer was tapped to direct a feature film remake with production input from original series creator Glen A. Larson. Larson's death in 2014 caused a delay, but in 2016 Lisa Joy was assigned to be the screenwriter and the studio was considering Francis Lawrence to replace Singer as director.

A reboot of the reimagined Galactica was announced in 2020 as a future addition to NBCUniversal's Peacock streaming service. Mr. Robot creator Sam Esmail is to serve as the new Galactica'''s executive producer.

See also

 List of Battlestar Galactica characters
 List of Battlestar Galactica (1978, 1980) episodes
 Battlestar Galactica (fictional spacecraft)
 Space Mutiny, a science fiction film that used shots from Battlestar Galactica for space scenes

References

Further reading
 Criswell, David and Richie Levine (2006). Somewhere Beyond the Heavens: Battlestar Galactica Unofficial Companion''. Imprint Books. .

External links

 
 
 
 Battlestar Galactica on NBC.com

Battlestar Galactica
1978 American television series debuts
1979 American television series endings
American adventure television series
1970s American science fiction television series
Television series by Universal Television
American Broadcasting Company original programming
Space adventure television series
English-language television shows
Television series created by Glen A. Larson
Military science fiction television series
Television shows adapted into comics
Television shows adapted into video games
Television shows involved in plagiarism controversies